John Innes compost is a set of four formulae for growing media, developed at the former John Innes Horticultural Institution (JIHI), now the John Innes Centre, in the 1930s and released into the public domain.

The scientists who developed the formulae were William Lawrence and John Newell. The director at the time was Daniel Hall.
Lawrence started to investigate the whole procedure of making seed and potting composts following a major disaster in 1933 with Primula sinensis seedlings, an important experimental plant for JIHI geneticists.

After hundreds of trials, Lawrence and Newell arrived at two basic composts, a base fertiliser for use in the potting compost and a standard feed. The formulae of these as yet unnamed composts were published in 1938.

These composts originally provided a sterile and well balanced growing medium for the experimental plant material needed at the institute.

The institution made the formulae generally available, but never manufactured the composts for sale nor benefited financially from their production. The name ‘John Innes Compost’ was allotted in 1938–39; the horticultural retail trade in the composts made ‘John Innes’ a household name, but JIHI received no financial benefit from them.

The formulae contain loam, peat, sand or grit, and fertiliser in varying ratios for specific purposes. The John Innes growing media are predominantly loam (soil) based.

References

External links
John Innes Centre information on John Innes Compost
John Innes Manufacturers' Association

Composting
1930s introductions